Gordana Jankuloska (born 12 October 1975) is the former 10th Interior Minister of the Government of North Macedonia. She was a Minister in four cabinets of Nikola Gruevski. During the 2015 Macedonian protests, activists demanded that Gruevski and his cabinet resign. Jankuloska and two others resigned from their positions. She was replaced as the interior minister by Mitko Čavkov. Jankuloska was sentenced to 6 years for “misuse of office” by a first-instance court in 2018, but her sentence was reduced by the higher court. She was sent to jail on 28.9.2020, after the court of appeals sentenced her to 4-years for her involvement in the purchase of a luxury car for about 600 thousand euros.

References

Living people
People from Ohrid
Government ministers of North Macedonia
1975 births
VMRO-DPMNE politicians
Women government ministers of North Macedonia
21st-century Macedonian women politicians
21st-century Macedonian politicians
Female interior ministers
Internal affairs ministers of North Macedonia